The Avanton Gold Cone or Avanton Cone, or Avanton gold hat is a late Bronze Age artefact, belonging to the group of Golden hats, only four of which are known so far.

The Avanton Cone was the second such object to be discovered (after the Golden Hat of Schifferstadt). The object was damaged; comparison with other finds suggests that a part (the brim) is missing. Originally dated to the Middle Bronze and suggested to be a fertility symbol, it now appears to be of later date and more complex function (see Golden hats).

The Avanton Cone is on display in the Musée d'Archéologie Nationale at Saint-Germain-en-Laye, near Paris.

See also 
 Golden hats
 Berlin Gold Hat, circa 1,000-800 BC
 Golden Hat of Schifferstadt, ca. 1400-1300 BC 
 Golden Cone of Ezelsdorf-Buch, circa 1,000-800 BC

References 
Tourism website referring to the Avanton Cone
 Gold und Kult der Bronzezeit. (AusstellungsKatalog). Germanisches 	Nationalmuseum, Nürnberg 2003. 
 Wilfried Menghin (ed.): Acta Praehistorica et Archaeologica. Unze, Potsdam 32.2000, S. 31-108. 
 Peter Schauer: Die Goldblechkegel der Bronzezeit – Ein Beitrag zur Kulturverbindung zwischen Orient und Mitteleuropa. Habelt, Bonn 1986. 

Archaeological discoveries in Europe
Archaeological discoveries in France
Archaeology of Poitiers
Bronze Age France
Bronze Age gold hats
Vienne